Trinidad and Tobago competed at the 1996 Summer Olympics in Atlanta, United States.

Medalists

Bronze
Ato Boldon — Athletics, Men's 100 metres
Ato Boldon — Athletics, Men's 200 metres

Results and competitors by event

Athletics
Men's 100 metres
 Ato Boldon

Men's 200 metres
 Ato Boldon
 Neil de Silva

Men's 400 metres
 Neil de Silva
 Robert Guy

Men's Javelin Throw
 Kirt Thompson

Men's Long Jump
 Wendell Williams

Men's Marathon
 Ronnie Holassie — 2:27.20 (→ 75th place)

Women's High Jump
 Natasha Alleyne
 Qualification — 1.85m (→ did not advance)

Women's Triple Jump
 Natasha Alleyne

Badminton
Women's Singles Competition
 Debra O'Connor

Boxing
Men's Light Middleweight (71 kg)
Kurt Sinette 
 First Round — Lost to Yared Wolde (Ethiopia), 10-11

Cycling

Swimming
Women's 50m Freestyle
 Siobhan Cropper
 Heat — 26.29 (→ did not advance, 19th place)

Women's 100m Freestyle
 Siobhan Cropper
 Heat — 57.30 (→ did not advance, 26th place)

Table tennis
Men's Singles Competition
 Dexter St. Louis

See also
Trinidad and Tobago at the 1995 Pan American Games

References
Official Olympic Reports
International Olympic Committee results database

Nations at the 1996 Summer Olympics
1996
Summer Olympics